Kepler-24e is a transiting exoplanet orbiting the star Kepler-24, located in the constellation Lyra. It was discovered by the Kepler telescope in February 2014. It orbits its parent star at only 0.138 astronomical units away, and at its distance it completes an orbit once every 19 days.

References

Transiting exoplanets
Exoplanets discovered by the Kepler space telescope
Exoplanets discovered in 2014
Kepler-24
Lyra (constellation)